June Antoinette Pointer (November 30, 1953 – April 11, 2006) was an American singer, best known as the youngest of the founding members of the vocal group the Pointer Sisters.

Early life and career
Born the youngest of six children to minister parents Reverend Elton and Sarah Pointer, June shared a love of singing with her sisters. In 1969, she and sister Bonnie founded The Pointers – A Pair. The duo sang at numerous clubs, then became a trio later that year when sister Anita quit her job as a secretary to join them. The group officially changed its name to the Pointer Sisters. The trio signed a record deal with Atlantic Records and released a few singles, none of which made a substantial impact on the music charts. In 1972, sister Ruth joined the group, making it a quartet. The sisters then signed with Blue Thumb Records, and their career began to take off.

The Pointer Sisters and solo career
Releasing their self-titled debut album in 1973, the Pointer Sisters found immediate fame with hits such as "Yes We Can Can" and "Wang Dang Doodle". Subsequent albums boasted top-charting songs such as "Fairytale", "How Long (Betcha Got a Chick on the Side)" and "You Gotta Believe".  June left the group in November 1975 due to health problems as she was advised to retire due to extreme mental and physical exhaustion; Bonnie Pointer exited from the group to forge a solo career in 1977.

Upon June's return, the remaining sisters found huge success, reaching the Top 10 in early 1979 with a cover of Bruce Springsteen's "Fire"; that began a string of hits which included "Happiness", "He's So Shy" (1980), "Slow Hand" (1981), "American Music", "Should I Do It" and "I'm So Excited". In 1983, the group released what would be their biggest album to date, Break Out. It included the Top 10 hits "Automatic"; "Jump (For My Love)"; a re-release of "I'm So Excited", which became a bigger hit than when originally released in 1982; and "Neutron Dance". Subsequent albums spawned hits such as "Dare Me", "Freedom" and "Goldmine". (Pointer sang lead vocals on several of the group's top singles, including "Happiness", "He's So Shy", "Jump (For My Love)", "Baby Come And Get It" and "Dare Me".)

Eventually, June ventured into a solo career while staying with the Pointer Sisters; she released the Baby Sister album in 1983 (it scored a modest hit with "Ready for Some Action", #28 R&B) and a self-titled effort in 1989 (its charting single was "Tight On Time (Fit U In), #70 R&B)". June also performed the song "Little Boy Sweet" for the 1983 film National Lampoon's Vacation. In 1987, she scored a top 5 pop single with Bruce Willis with a cover of the Staples Singers' "Respect Yourself". She also gained notoriety for posing for Playboy magazine in 1985. In September 1994, the Pointer Sisters received a star on the Hollywood Walk of Fame.

Personal life
June was married to William Oliver Whitmore II for thirteen years, from 1978 until 1991. She had no children. She was addicted to cocaine for much of her career, and she was ousted from the Pointer Sisters in 2004. On April 22, 2004, June was charged with felony cocaine possession and misdemeanor possession of a smoking device. She was ordered to a rehabilitation facility.

Death
On February 27, 2006, June suffered a stroke. While hospitalized, she was diagnosed with cancer, which had metastasized in her breast, colon, liver and bones. She died at UCLA Medical Center in Los Angeles, California, on April 11, 2006, at the age of 52. A family statement said June died "in the arms of her sisters Ruth and Anita and  her brothers Aaron and Fritz by her side".

Discography

Solo
Baby Sister (1983, Planet Records)
 "Ready for Some Action" (5:59) #28 R&B
 "I Will Understand" (4:32)
 "To You, My Love" (4:26)
 "New Love, True Love" (4:23)
 "I'm Ready for Love" (3:58)
 "You Can Do It" (4:32)
 "Always" (3:50)
 "My Blues Have Gone" (4:25)
 "Don't Mess With Bill" (3:07)

June recorded a duet with Dionne Warwick, "Heartbreak of Love", for Dionne's 1987 album, Reservations for Two.  Their duet later appeared on the B-side of Warwick's 1989 single "Take Good Care of You and Me".

June Pointer (1989, Columbia Records)
 "Tight on Time (I'll Fit U In)" (4:00) #70 R&B
 "Parlez Moi D'Amour (Let's Talk About Love)" (4:38)
 "Why Can't We Be Together" (4:34) duet with Phil Perry
 "How Long (Don't Make Me Wait)" (4:21)
 "Put Your Dreams Where Your Heart Is" (4:57)
 "Keeper of the Flame" (4:50)
 "Love Calling" (3:36)
 "Fool for Love" (4:35)
 "Live with Me" (5:35)
 "Love on the Line" (5:10)

References

External links

June Pointer profile
Pointer Sisters discography

1953 births
2006 deaths
The Pointer Sisters members
20th-century African-American women singers
American rhythm and blues singers
Deaths from bone cancer
Deaths from liver cancer
Deaths from lung cancer in California
Musicians from Oakland, California
June
20th-century American singers
20th-century American women singers
21st-century African-American people
21st-century African-American women
United Service Organizations entertainers